Louis Greaves Armitage (15 December 1921 – 2000) was an English professional footballer who played as an inside forward.

References

1921 births
2000 deaths
Footballers from Kingston upon Hull
English footballers
Association football inside forwards
Rotherham United F.C. players
Grimsby Town F.C. players
English Football League players